Broadway Hostess is a 1935 American romantic comedy musical film directed by Frank McDonald and starring Wini Shaw, Genevieve Tobin and Lyle Talbot. The film was nominated at the 1935 Academy Awards for the short lived Best Dance Direction category. For which Bobby Connolly was nominated for, along with the film Go into Your Dance.

Plot
Shaw plays a small town girl on her rise to stardom as a night club singer who is nevertheless not as fortunate with love. Pianist Tommy falls for her, even though he suspects she's in love with her manager Lucky. Lucky claims he doesn't want to get married, but is in fact in love with socialite Iris, who brings him into her circle of rich snobs, including her brother, a hot-tempered drunk with a huge gambling problem.

Cast

Main
 Winifred Shaw as Winnie
 Genevieve Tobin as Iris
 Lyle Talbot as Lucky
 Allen Jenkins as Fishcake
 Phil Regan as Tommy
 Marie Wilson as Dorothy
 Spring Byington as Mrs. Duncan-Griswald-Wembly-Smythe 
 Joseph King as Big Joe Jarvis
 Donald Ross as Ronnie Marvin
 Frank Dawson as Morse - Iris' Butler
 Harry Seymour as Club Intime Emcee

Uncredited (Incomplete)
 Ward Bond as Lucky's Henchman
 Richard Powell as Third Member of Quartet in 'Playboy of Paree' Number 
 June Travis as Mrs. Bannister
 Jack Wise as Nightclub Waiter 
 Jane Wyman as a chorus girl

Reviews
Andre Sennwald of The New York Times gave it a bad review saying it was very clichéd and hard to sit through.

References

External links 
 
 
 
 

1935 romantic comedy films
1935 musical comedy films
1935 films
American black-and-white films
1930s English-language films
American romantic comedy films
American romantic musical films
Films directed by Frank McDonald
Warner Bros. films
1930s American films